Papé is a surname. Notable people with the surname include:

Pascal Papé (born 1980), French rugby player
Frank C. Papé (1878–1972), English artist and book illustrator

See also
Pape (disambiguation)

Surnames